M. Satish Reddy is an Indian politician and member of the Bharatiya Janata Party. Reddy is a member of the Karnataka Legislative Assembly from the Bommanahalli constituency in Bangalore Urban district.

References

Politicians from Bangalore
Bharatiya Janata Party politicians from Karnataka
Living people
Karnataka politicians
Karnataka MLAs 2018–2023
Year of birth missing (living people)
Karnataka MLAs 2008–2013
Karnataka MLAs 2013–2018